Agastachys odorata, commonly known as the white waratah or fragrant candlebush, is the sole member of the genus Agastachys in the protea family. It is an evergreen shrub to small tree and is endemic to the heaths and button grass sedgelands of western Tasmania.

Diagnostic features 
Agastachys odorata is an erect, evergreen shrub that is endemic to Tasmania. A. odorata  can be variable in shape, though mature individuals are commonly found between 1–3 metres in height and 0.5- 1 meter in width. A. odorata displays many of the diagnostic characteristics of the Proteaceae family it belongs to. The primary protea features A. odorata exhibit's are leathery alternate leaves and irregular woody floral structures(see figure 1 and figure 2 below).

The leaves have entire margins with rounded tips. They are bright green in appearance with an almost leathery thick texture. The leaf looks like a football field stretched from one end, being classified as narrow-oblong to oblanceolate. The leaves lack hairs (see figure 1 below).

The inflorescence flower spikes are the most obvious feature to distinguish A. odorata from other species by (see figure 2 below). The peak flowering times are during the early Australian summer months of December and January. Simply put the flower spikes look like fluffy white-to-creamy yellow candles, appropriate as one of the common names for A. odorata is fragrant candlebush. The flowers also resemble an erect, lighter coloured version of Tasmanian waratah (Telopea truncate), hence its other common name of white waratah. Masses of white-to-creamy yellow flowers are produced in erect flower spikes. The flower spikes are clustered on the ends of branches. The spikes range in height from 8 to 12 cm, hence can be noticed from a distance as the flower spikes pop above the canopy of the shrub. The flowers produce a floral odour which some describe as pleasant (see figure 2 below).

Flowering is followed by the production of an inconspicuous woody winged nut. The morphology of the relatively large wings on the nut assist in seed dispersal by wind (anemochory). The nut is often a brown-ish colour.

Distribution and habitat 
Agastachys odorata is endemic to Tasmania, Australia. It grows in highest abundances in the western and southern regions of Tasmania (see figure 3 below). A current distribution of A. odorata can be found on the Atlas of living Australia website (Agastachys odorata interactive distribution map). A. odorata can be found in a variety of 'wet' vegetation types across Tasmania. Most often in heath, scrub, wet sclerophyll/eucalypt forest, temperate rainforest and occasionally in the alpine regions. A. odorata prefers  to grow in areas of high rainfall, hence its limited distribution toward to drier eastern parts of Tasmania.

A. odorata is commonly found on nutrient poor soils. The proteoid roots produced by A. odorata, a feature of the proteaceae family, increase the nutrient absorption of the plant, helping the species to thrive in harsh nutrient conditions. The proteoid roots facilitate increased nutrient absorption as the dense clusters of roots increase the surface area for nutrient uptake to occur across

A great place to see A. odorata is in the Southwest and Franklin-Gordan Wild Rivers National Parks, Tasmania. Here you will see such amazing specimens such as figure 4 (see below) from Frenchmans Cap of A. odorata.

Threats and conservation issues 
Currently, Agastachys odorata  is not listed as a threatened species on either the Tasmanian Threatened Species List or the EPBC Act List of Threatened Flora. However, as A. odorata is an underrepresented species in ecological and scientific works, the effects of climate and land-use changes occurring Tasmania, Australia, does not ensure that its populations are secure into the future. The species is not widely cultivated in gardens, with successful propagation difficult and rare with traditional techniques, such as seed germination, being unreliable. Despite the challenges mentioned, seeds have been collected, and are stored to Tasmanian Seed Conservation Centre.

Agastachys odorata is known to be highly susceptible to Phytophthora cinnamomi dieback. The root-rot fungus puts the species at risk into the future as the disease spreads across Tasmania.

However, organisations such as Australian Native Plant Society, rate the overall conservation status of the species as "Not considered to be at risk in the wild".

Botanical history 
The derivation of the name is descriptive of the features of the species, which is usefully when learning to identify the beautiful species that is Agastachys odorata. In Greek Agastachys refers to the abundant spikes (the flower spikes) and odorata  in Latin refers to the pungent odour the flowers produce.

Scottish botanist Robert Brown described Agastachys odorata in 1810. The Agastachys  genus only contains the single species. A. odorata has been grouped formally with the Australian genera, Symphionema and New Caledonian genera Beauprea and Beaupreopsis in the subtribe Cenarrheninae. However, Peter H. Weston and Nigel Barker reviewed the suprageneric relationships of the Proteaceae in 2006, using molecular and morphological data. In this scheme Agastachys and Symphionema are sister taxa in a clade which diverged early from the main lineage, and they are classified in their own subfamily Symphionematoideae.

References

External links

Proteaceae
Proteales of Australia
Trees of Australia
Endemic flora of Tasmania
Monotypic Proteaceae genera